Rebecca Rose Fraser (born May 1957) is a British writer and broadcaster.

She is a former president of the Brontë Society. She is the author of the introductions to the Everyman's Library editions of Shirley and The Professor.

Her husband is Edward Fitzgerald QC.

Selected publications
 Charlotte Bronte, London: Methuen London, 1988. , 
The Brontës: Charlotte Brontë and her family, New York: Fawcett Columbine, 1988. , 
 , 
 The Mayflower Generation, New York: St. Martin's Press, 2017. ,

References

External links
 

Living people
1957 births
British non-fiction writers
Brontë family
British biographers
Women biographers